Marshall Sherman (1823 – April 19, 1896) was an American soldier who fought with the Union Army in the American Civil War. Sherman received his country's highest award for bravery during combat, the Medal of Honor, for actions taken on July 3, 1863 during the Battle of Gettysburg.

Early life
Sherman was born in Burlington, Vermont in 1823, and in 1849 moved to Saint Paul, Minnesota Territory, in search of work as a painter. At the outset of the Civil War, at the age of 37, Sherman mustered into the 1st Minnesota Volunteer Regiment.

Civil War service
The 1st Minnesota was the very first group of volunteers the Union Army received at the beginning of the Civil War. Fabled for taking part in almost every major engagement in the eastern theater of the war, Sherman was therefore involved in many battles during his 3 year enlistment.

During the Battle of Gettysburg Sherman and the rest of Company C joined the rest of their regiment at the East Cavalry Field. The days before saw the regiment lose roughly 80% of its troops after a deadly action at Plum Run. On July 3, while engaging with the 28th Virginia Infantry, Sherman captured the enemy flag, though stories of how he came to attain it differ.

According to Sherman's own reports following the war, he ran down the enemy flag bearer and forced him to hand over the flag on threat of death. Sherman then took the flag and the enemy as prisoner. However, fellow private Daniel Bond remembered seeing the flag leaning against a tree, but lost a footrace to it after Sherman, who was closer, spotted it as well.

Following Gettysburg, Sherman remained in the army for another year. He lost his leg in 1864 in a skirmish near Petersburg and was mustered out of the army.

Medal of Honor citation

Later years
Sherman had no apparent descendants, and very little of his life is known. He died in 1896, and the banner that he captured was displayed at his funeral. It eventually was added to the collection of the Minnesota Historical Society.

Sherman is interred at Oakland Cemetery in Saint Paul, Minnesota.

References

External links
Marshall Sherman on Find A Grave

1823 births
1896 deaths
American Civil War recipients of the Medal of Honor
People from Burlington, Vermont
People of Minnesota in the American Civil War
People of Vermont in the American Civil War
United States Army Medal of Honor recipients